Adrenal ferredoxin (also adrenodoxin (ADX), adrenodoxin, mitochondrial, hepatoredoxin, ferredoxin-1 (FDX1)) is a protein that in humans is encoded by the FDX1 gene.   In addition to the expressed gene at this chromosomal locus (11q22), there are pseudogenes located on chromosomes 20 and 21.

Function 

Adrenodoxin is a small iron-sulfur protein that can accept and carry a single electron. Adrenodoxin functions as an electron transfer protein in the mitochondrial cytochrome P450 systems. The first enzyme in this system is adrenodoxin reductase that carries an FAD. FAD can be reduced by two electrons donated from coenzyme NADPH. These two electrons are transferred one a time to adrenodoxin. Adrenodoxin in return reduces mitochondrial cytochrome P450. This particular oxidation/reduction system is involved in the synthesis of steroid hormones in steroidogenic tissues. In addition, similar systems also function in vitamin D and bile acid synthesis in the kidney and liver respectively. Adrenodoxin has been identified in a number of different tissues but all forms have been shown to be identical and are not tissue specific.

References

Further reading

External links